Festive in Death is the 39th book written by Nora Roberts under the pseudonym of J.D Robb.

Plot summary 
Eve Dallas is a homicide detective who investigates a list of women who were romanced by a murdered personal trainer during the pre-Christmas party season.

References

External links
 In Death series order

In Death (novel series)
2014 American novels
Christmas novels
G. P. Putnam's Sons books